The Kungur Letopis, also known as the Kungur Chronicle and Brief Siberian Kungur Letopis (Кунгурская летопись, Кунгурский летописец, Летопись сибирская краткая Кунгурская in Russian) is one of the Siberian Letopises, written in the late 16th century by one of Yermak's companions during his Siberian campaign.

The full version of the Kungur Letopis did not survive to this day. It was partially included in one of the Siberian Letopises known as the Remezov Letopis. The Kungur Letopis contains the description of Yermak's Siberian campaign and valuable historic, geographic and ethnographic data on Siberia and its 16th-century inhabitants. It is written in a folk Cossack-style language.

Resources
 Сибирь XVII века глазами современника. С.У. Ремезов и его "История Сибирская" (The 17th-century Siberia seen by a man of the times. S.U. Remezov and his "Siberian History")  (many illustrations)

East Slavic chronicles
History of Siberia
16th-century history books
History books about the 16th  century
Khanate of Sibir